Myers is a common surname, and may also refer to:

Places
Myers, Kentucky, United States
Fort Myers, Florida, United States
Myers City, South Dakota, United States
Myers Flat, California
Myers Park (disambiguation) (various)
Myersville, Maryland, United States
Myersville, Ohio, United States
Myerstown, Pennsylvania, United States

Other uses
 Myers v. United States, 1926 United States Supreme Court decision 
 Myers College, university-preparatory school in Chakwal, Punjab, Pakistan
 Myers department store, a former department store in Whittier, California, rebranded as Boston Stores in 1976
 Myers Hall (disambiguation), various
 Myers theorem, in Riemannian geometry
 Myers–Briggs Type Indicator, personality questionnaire
 O’Melveny & Myers, international law firm in Los Angeles, California, USA
 Stover-Myers Mill, in Bucks County, Pennsylvania, USA

See also 

Maier
Mair (disambiguation)
Mayer (disambiguation)
Mayr
Meier
Meir (disambiguation)
Meyer (disambiguation)
Meyers
Meyr (disambiguation)
Myer (disambiguation)
Von Meyer
Justice Myers (disambiguation)